is the fourth single by Japanese girl group Melon Kinenbi. It was used as the ending theme for TV Tokyo's show Mr. Marick's Magic Time. It was released on October 11, 2001, and its highest position on the Oricon weekly chart was #28.

Track listing

References

External links
This is Unmei at the Up-Front Works release list (Zetima) (Japanese)

2001 singles
Zetima Records singles
Song recordings produced by Tsunku
2001 songs
Songs written by Tsunku